The 1947 Detroit Lions season was their 18th in the league. The team improved on their previous season's output of 1–10, winning three games. They failed to qualify for the playoffs for the 12th consecutive season.

Before the season

Draft

Schedule

Standings

Players
 Stan Batinski, guard
 Ben Chase, guard
 Ted Cook, end
 Ted Cremer, end
 Bob DeFruiter, halfback
 Robert Derleth, tackle
 Chuck DeShane, guard
 Bill Dudley, halfback
 Jack Dugger, tackle
 Leon Fichman
 John Greene, end
 George Hekkers
 Ralph Heywood, end
 Bill Hillman
 Bob Ivory
 Tommy James, defensive back
 Elmer Jones, guard
 Pete Kmetovic, halfback
 Les Lear, tackle
 Clyde LeForce, quarterback
 Elmer Madarik, halfback
 Joe Margucci, halfback
 Kelly Mote, end
 Reed Nilsen
 Bill O'Brien, halfback
 Mitchell Olenski, tackle
 Merv Pregulman, center
 Ken Reese
 Floyd Rhea, offensive lineman
 Dave Ryan, quarterback
 John Sanchez, tackle
 Cecil Souders, end
 Ed Stacco, tackle
 Dick Stovall, center
 Steve Sucic
 Frank Szymanski, center
 Russ Thomas, tackle
 Walt Vezmar, guard
 Bill Ward, guard
 Joe Watt, halfback
 Bob Westfall, fullback
 Bob Wiese, back
 Camp Wilson, fullback
 Roy Zimmerman, quarterback

References

External links
1947 Detroit Lions at Pro Football Reference
1947 Detroit Lions at jt-sw.com

Detroit Lions seasons
Detroit Lions
Detroit Lions